Stadionul Gaz Metan is a multi-purpose stadium in Mediaş, Romania.  It is frequently used for football and is the home ground of Gaz Metan Mediaş.

Events

Association football

References

See also
List of football stadiums in Romania

Football venues in Romania
Sibiu
Multi-purpose stadiums in Romania
Buildings and structures in Sibiu County